Ikama is an administrative ward in the Kyela district of the Mbeya Region of Tanzania. In 2016 the Tanzania National Bureau of Statistics report there were 5,206 people in the ward, from 4,724 in 2012.

Villages / vitongoji 
The ward has 4 villages and 16 vitongoji.

 Fubu
 Fubu
 Lyongo
 Mbwato
 Ndondobya
 Seko
 Ilopa
 Bugoloka
 Ilopa
 Kyimo
 Ndwanga
 Mpunguti
 Ikama
 Mpanga
 Mpunguti A
 Mpunguti B
 Mwambusye
 Busalano
 Itiki
 Nsela

References 

Wards of Mbeya Region